Austral Ecology: A Journal of Ecology in the Southern Hemisphere is a peer-reviewed scientific journal covering research related to the ecology of land, marine, and freshwater systems in the Southern Hemisphere. It is published by  Wiley and is the official journal of the Ecological Society of Australia. The journal addresses the commonality between ecosystems in Australia and many parts of southern Africa, South America, New Zealand, and Oceania. For example, many species in the unique biotas of these regions share common Gondwana ancestors. The journal was established in 1976 as Australian Journal of Ecology, obtaining its current name in 2000. , the editor-in-chief is Nigel Andrew (University of New England, New South Wales, Australia).

The Michael Bull prize, named after a long-time editor, is awarded yearly for the best student-led paper published in the journal.

Manuscript types 
The journal publishes the following article types:

Editors-in-chief 
The following persons are or have been editor-in-chief of the journal:

Abstracting and indexing
The journal is abstracted and indexed in:

According to the Journal Citation Reports, the journal has a 2020 impact factor of 2.087.

References

External links

Ecology journals
8 times per year journals
Wiley (publisher) academic journals
English-language journals
Publications established in 1976